Wind River Tribal College, or WRTC, is a tribally chartered college located in Fort Washakie, Wyoming. The campus is on the Wind River Indian Reservation in central Wyoming. WRTC serves residents of the Wind River Indian Reservation and surrounding communities. WRTC's enrollment consists of mostly Northern Arapaho and Eastern Shoshone students.

History
WRTC was chartered by the Northern Arapaho Business Council in September 1997.

Partnerships
WRTC has articulation agreements with the University of Wyoming and the University of Wisconsin-Oshkosh.

WRTC is a member of the American Indian Higher Education Consortium (AIHEC), which is a community of tribally  and federally chartered institutions working to strengthen tribal nations and make a lasting difference in the lives of American Indians and Alaska Natives. WRTC was created in response to the higher education needs of American Indians. WRTC generally serves geographically isolated populations that have no other means accessing education beyond the high school level.
In 2013, WRTC graduated 10 students with their bachelor of arts degree in elementary education. The cohort was the first graduates of the partnership between Wind River and Oshkosh.

Programs
WRTC offers associate degree programs in:
 social work, 
 business administration, 
 elementary education, and 
 criminal justice.

In Summer 2015, the college hosted an Arapaho language camp.

References

External links

  Wind River Tribal College

Community colleges in Wyoming
Tribal colleges and universities
Land-grant universities and colleges
1997 establishments in Wyoming
Educational institutions established in 1997
Public universities and colleges in Wyoming
Wind River Indian Reservation